The Johnstone Gallery was a private gallery located in the suburb of Bowen Hills in Brisbane, Queensland, Australia co-owned by Brian Johnstone and his wife, Marjorie Johnstone (née Mant). It was the leading Brisbane commercial gallery exhibiting contemporary Australian art from 1950 until 1972.

History

Establishment 

Brian Johnstone ran Marodian Gallery at 452 Upper Edward Street, Spring Hill, during 1950-1951 in a gallery at the rear of Hugh Hale's interior decorating shop. The partnership terminated when Hale criticised an Arthur Boyd exhibition. Johnstone Gallery then moved to the basement of the Brisbane Arcade, into what had been an air-raid shelter, from 1952 to 1957 before it was permanently sited at 6 Cintra Road, Bowen Hills in 1958 in a purpose built space in a sub-tropical rainforest setting. There, owners Brian and Marjorie Johnstone showed most major Australian artists of the period, including Sir Sidney Nolan, Robert Dickerson, Lawrence Daws, Margaret Olley (whose 1962 exhibition sold out at the opening for £3000, then a record for an Australia woman artist), Charles Blackman, Ray Crooke, John Coburn, Arthur Boyd, Donald Friend, Laurence Hope and others in post-war Brisbane which had few visual art offerings beyond Queensland Art Gallery.

Theatre 
The sub-tropical rainforest garden was also the stage for theatre, including a production by Twelfth Night Theatre, then situated in inner city Wickham Terrace, of Aristophanes' Lysistrata with the set and costumes designed by Quentin Hole, 24–27 April 1962. With plans from 1966 to establish a unique suburban artistic precinct in Brisbane the couple formed a committee to permanently establish what would become the new location of Twelfth Night Theatre. Prior to the commencement of building it, a production of Under Milk Wood by Dylan Thomas was staged in a tent on the site. Construction began in 1969 and the theatre opened in February 1971 under the direction of Joan Whalley, with two productions, A Flea in Her Ear by Georges Feydeau and The Rose and the Ring a musical based on the fireside pantomime written by William Makepeace Thackeray. The Johnstones were delighted, as Brian wrote to Sidney Nolan:

"...with the new half-million dollar theatre next door, the establishment is now nicely rounded off, so perhaps one of these days Marjorie and I will be able to play ladies and gentlemen of the art world!"

The theatre continues under the directorship of Gail Wiltshire.

Legacy
Johnstone Gallery closed in December 1972, and the gallery buildings have since been demolished and the rainforest gardens lost to the development of townhouses. Following the closure Brian Johnstone operated an art consultancy for a few years.

In 1994, after her death in 1993, the estate of Marjorie Johnstone bequeathed the Johnstone Gallery Archive to the State Library of Queensland. The collection features 26 bound volumes of scrapbooks, gallery files, printed exhibition catalogues, correspondence, photographs, and is a major resource for provenance research of Australian artworks and artists. Photographer Arthur Davenport recorded many of the artworks and gallery installations from 1964 to 1972, which can be seen in the State Library of Queensland's Arthur Davenport collection.  The State Library has also produced a series of digital stories and oral histories with many of the artists and gallery owners who were associated with the Johnstone Gallery - John White, Philip Bacon, Victor Mace and artists Nevil Matthews, Margaret Olley, Laurence Daws, Ray Crooke, Roy Churcher, Betty Churcher, Robert Dickerson and Max Hurley.

In 2021 The Johnstone Gallery Archive was added to UNESCO's Australian Memory of the World Register.

Exhibitions 

 1952, Laurence Hope
 1961, 14-30 Nov; Donald Friend
 1962, February; William Peascod
 1962, 28 April-10 May; 50 Drawings of old Brisbane, Kenneth Jack
 1962, September; Fred Jessup
 1962, October; Adrian Feint
 1962, November; Margaret Olley
 1962, December; John Coburn
 1963, 28 July–; Moya Dyring
 1963, August; Francis Lymburner
 1963 13-28 Aug; Yulgilbar 1863-1963 and other paintings, Donald Friend
 1964, 28 Feb-25 March; Arthur Boyd, Charles Blackman, Lawrence Daws
 1964 14-22 April; Paintings by Shay Docking
 1964, 13-25 June; Paintings and drawings by Mervyn Moriarty
 1964, 14-29 July; James Gleeson
 1964, 18-30 July; Peter Kennedy
 1964, August; New Guinea paintings Ray Crooke, Baillieu Myer commission for 1964.
 1964, 18 Sept-7 Oct; Recollections of Raratonga, Henry Bell
 1964, 30 Oct- 19 Nov; Gordon Shepherdson downstairs in Gallery F
 1964, 30 Oct- 19 Nov; John Aland
 1964, 15 Nov-2-Dec; Brian Seidel
 1964,  6-24 December; Alex Leckie
 1965, 8-23 June; Paintings by June Stephenson
 1965, 21 Sept-6 Oct; Ken Reinhard
 1965, 12-27 Oct; Michael Kmit
 1966, 4-21 September; Alice in Wonderland, Charles Blackman
 1967, 21 March–5 April: Rosemary Ryan
 1967, 25 July-9 August, Arthur Boyd
 1967, 17 Oct-1 Nov; Paintings by Lawrence Daws
 1968, 14-26 Oct; Leaves from a New Guinea Sketch Book and other paintings by Margaret Olley
 1969, 30 March-12 April; The Dolley Pond Church of God with signs following suite and other paintings by Lawrence Daws
 1969, 30 March-12 April; People in miniature  series, Ann Graham
 1969, 22 June–5 July; A homage to Breughel, Manet, Daumier, Picasso, Degas, Rembrandt, Goya, Renoir, Robert Dickerson
 1969, 13 July-2 August; Documenta espirita, Ignacio Marmol
 1969, 10-23 August; Arthur Boyd
 1969, 23 Nov-20 Dec; Sculpture by Guy Boyd
 1969, 23 Nov-6 Dec; Laurence Hope
 1970, 4-26 Sept; The 1913 mining disaster,  paintings by Lawrence Daws
 1970, 2-24 Oct; Paintings by Margaret Olley
 1970, 30 Oct-21 Nov:  An Experience of Paris: park, cathedral, city. Charles Blackman
 1971, 9-31 July; Dust, Sidney Nolan
 1971, 6-28 Aug; The Professionals and other people, Robert Dickerson
 1972, 6-29 Sept; Anatomy of a Relationship, Lawrence Daws
 1972,1-20 Oct; Homage, Margaret Olley

References

External links
 RBHARC-7 Johnstone Gallery Archive 1948-ca. 1992. State Library of Queensland collection record.
Johnstone Gallery Archive Interviews State Library of Queensland collection record.
 Johnstone Gallery Archive resources State Library of Queensland's online portal to the Johnstone Gallery Archive.
The Johnstone Gallery Archive 1948 - ca 1992: treasure collection of the Australian Library of Art, John Oxley Library blog, State Library of Queensland.
Twelfth Night Theatre 
Johnstone Gallery Archive 1948-c1992 and Arthur Davenport Photographs 1955-1992 -  Australian Memory of the World 

Art museums and galleries in Queensland
Museums in Brisbane
1972 disestablishments in Australia
Art galleries disestablished in 1972
Defunct museums in Australia
Demolished buildings and structures in Queensland
Memory of the World Register in Australia